The 2016 Women's EuroHockey Club Trophy was the 40th edition of the women's Women's EuroHockey Club Trophy, Europe's secondary club field hockey tournament organized by the EHF. It was held from 13 to 16 May 2016 in Barcelona, Spain.

Rot-Weiss Köln won the tournament after defeating Royal Antwerp 4–2 in the final. Minsk finished third, after defeating Club de Polo 5–4 in penalties after the game finished a 3–3 draw.

Teams

 Grodno
 Minsk
 Royal Antwerp
 Rot-Weiss Köln
 Amiscora
 Club de Polo
 Sumchanka

Results

Preliminary round

Pool A

Pool B

Classification round

Fifth and sixth place

Third and fourth place

Final

Statistics

Final standings

References

Club Trophy Women
EuroHockey Club Trophy
International women's field hockey competitions hosted by Catalonia
Sports competitions in Barcelona
Women's EuroHockey Club Trophy